Critical point may refer to:
Critical phenomena in physics
Critical point (mathematics), in calculus, a point where a function's derivative is either zero or nonexistent
Critical point (set theory), an elementary embedding of a transitive class into another transitive class which is the smallest ordinal which is not mapped to itself
Critical point (thermodynamics), a temperature and pressure of a material beyond which there is no longer any difference between the liquid and gas phases
Quantum critical point
Critical point (network science)
Construction point, in skiing, a line that represents the steepest point on a hill

See also
Critical path (disambiguation)
Brillouin zone
Percolation thresholds

Mathematics disambiguation pages